Triplophos hemingi is a species of bristlemouth found in the Atlantic Ocean.  It is the only known species of its genus.  This species grows to a length of  SL.

References
 

Gonostomatidae
Fish described in 1901